"Dear…" is May J.'s second solo single, released on May 30, 2007. The A-side is described as a high quality ballad full of bitter-sweet sadness. The song was produced by Ryoji of Ketsumeishi. The single includes a remix of the previous single, "Here We Go", in the same way that "Here We Go" contained a remix of "My Girls". This is May J.'s lowest charting releaseever, singles and albums included.

Track listing
 "Dear..."
 "Love Blossom"
 "Here We Go (Buzzer Beats Remix)" (featuring Verbal & Taro Soul)
 "Dear... (TV Mix)"

Charts 
Oricon Sales Chart (Japan)

References

2007 singles
2007 songs
Ki/oon Music singles
Song articles with missing songwriters